Elisabeth Högberg (born in Jädraås on November 7, 1986) is a Swedish biathlete. She was on the gold-winning Swedish team at the 2009–10 Biathlon World Cup – World Cup 5. She resides in Östersund and considered soccer before trying on Biathlon. She competed for Sweden at the 2010 Winter Olympics. She went to the Sollefteå Ski High School.

During the 2019–2020 season, she won the IBU Cup.

Summer biathlon 
In August 2019, she became Swedish champion at the 7,5 kilometres sprint distance during the Swedish national summer biathlon championships in Sollefteå.

References

External links 
Official Website

1986 births
Living people
People from Ockelbo Municipality
Swedish female biathletes
Olympic biathletes of Sweden
Biathletes at the 2010 Winter Olympics
Biathletes at the 2018 Winter Olympics